is a railway station in Higashi-ku, Hamamatsu, Shizuoka Prefecture, Japan, operated by the Central Japan Railway Company (JR Tōkai ).

Lines

Station layout
Tenryūgawa Station has two island platforms, one serving Track 1, which is an infrequently used auxiliary platform, and Track 2. The other island platform serves Track 3, and Track 4, which is also an infrequently used auxiliary platform.  The two platforms are connected by an overpass. The station building has automated ticket machines, TOICA automated turnstiles and is staffed.

Platforms

Adjacent stations

|-
!colspan=5|Central Japan Railway Company

History
Tenryūgawa Station was opened on July 10, 1898 for both passenger and freight services. Regularly scheduled freight service was discontinued on March 15, 1972; however, occasional freight trains operated by the Japan Freight Railway Company continued to use the station until April 1, 2006. A new station building was complete in September 2016.

Station numbering was introduced to the section of the Tōkaidō Line operated JR Central in March 2018; Tenryūgawa Station was assigned station number CA33.

Passenger statistics
In fiscal 2017, the station was used by an average of 2783 passengers daily (boarding passengers only).

Surrounding area
Hamamatsu Arena

See also
 List of Railway Stations in Japan

References

Yoshikawa, Fumio. Tokaido-sen 130-nen no ayumi. Grand-Prix Publishing (2002) .

External links

Tenryūgawa Station home page.

Stations of Central Japan Railway Company
Tōkaidō Main Line
Railway stations in Japan opened in 1898
Railway stations in Shizuoka Prefecture
Railway stations in Hamamatsu